This article lists the squads for the 2012 Algarve Cup, held in Portugal. The 12 national teams involved in the tournament were required to register a squad of 21 players; only players in these squads were eligible to take part in the tournament.

Players marked (c) were named as captain for their national squad. Number of caps, players' club teams and players' age as of 29 February 2012 – the tournament's opening day.

Group A



Coach: Silvia Neid





Group B



Coach: Norio Sasaki

Coach: Eli Landsem

Source:

Coach:  Pia Sundhage

Group C

Coach: László Kiss

Source:

Coach: Susan Ronan



Coach:  Jarmo Matikainen

References

2012
squad